Antal Jäkl  (born 18 November 1971 in Beremend) is a Hungarian football player who retired.

External links
 Profile

1971 births
Living people
Sportspeople from Baranya County
Hungarian footballers
Beremendi SK footballers
Pécsi MFC players
Pécsi VSK footballers
Dunaújváros FC players
Győri ETO FC players
Association football midfielders